Duran Kalkan (born Güzelim, Tufanbeyli, Adana Province, Turkey, 1954), also known as Selahattin Abbas, or Selahattin Erdem  is a senior commander of the Kurdistan Workers' Party (PKK).

Duran Kalkan, Murat Karayılan and Cemil Bayık, the three current leaders of the PKK, are wanted by the United States Department of the Treasury and the Government of Turkey for recruiting child soldiers, involving in drug trafficking, targeting Turkish government officials, police and security forces, and indiscriminately injuring and killing civilians.

Biography
Kalkan was born in Güzelim, Tufanbeyli, Adana, in 1954 to a Turkish family that had migrated from Erzurum.

He was among a group around Abdullah Öcalan, Ali Haydar Kaytan and Cemîl Bayık amongst others which held regular meetings from 1973 onwards and were known as the Kurdistan Revolutionaries later on. He was shortly detained together with Öcalan and Haydar Kaytan in December 1974, as the Turkish authorities closed down the ADYÖD. In November the group established the Kurdistan Workers' Party in which he initially served as a guerrilla commander in the PKK. He succeeded Riza Altun as the PKK's transnational finance manager in the late 1980s and managed the organizations finances in Germany until the late 1980s. He was arrested in 1988 and prosecuted during the Kurdish trial in Düsseldorf, Germany. In pre-trial detention in Hamburg he made a hunger strike which lasted for 40 days. He was accused of together with Hasan Güler, to have led the European organization of the PKK and ordered the murder of Ramazan Adigüzel. The state prosecutor demanded a life sentence but he was given six years for being a leader within a terrorist organization and due to his pretrial detention he was released. After he moved to Iraqi Kurdistan, to evade arrest warrants. There he served as commander in the Arteshen Rizgariya Gelli Kurdistan (ARGK) and member of the PKK's Presidential Council, eventually becoming a member of the Executive Council of the Koma Civakên Kurdistan (KCK).

He publishes articles in the Özgür Gündem newspaper under the name Adil Bayram.

Kalkan is in the red category of the "most wanted terrorists list" published by the Ministry of Interior of the Republic of Turkey since October 28, 2015. The list contains information that Duran Kalkan was born in Adana in 1954 and is a member of the PKK/KCK organization. The Ministry announced that a monetary reward of up to 10 million Turkish liras will be given to Kalkan in this category.
On 13 December 2016, the Mardin 1st Criminal Court of Peace issued a detention warrant for Kalkan and Murat Karayılan, another PKK commander, as part of an investigation into the killing of the Kaymakam of Derik, Muhammet Fatih Safitürk.
In November 2018 the USA declared, that within their Reward for Justice Program they offered a bounty of 3 million US-dollars for informations that led to the capture of Duran Kalkan.

References

Living people
People from Tufanbeyli
Members of the Kurdistan Workers' Party
Turkish Kurdish people
Apoists
1954 births
Hunger strikes
Prisoners and detainees of Germany
People charged with terrorism
Hunger strikers